Pseudenyo is a genus of moths in the family Sphingidae, consisting of one species, Pseudenyo benitensis, which is found from Nigeria to Gabon. 

Both the genus and the species were described by William Jacob Holland in 1889.

References

Macroglossini
Monotypic moth genera
Fauna of the Central African Republic
Fauna of Gabon
Insects of West Africa
Moths of Africa
Taxa named by William Jacob Holland